Ramonce Taylor (born September 11, 1985) is an indoor football running back for the CenTex Cavalry of Champions Indoor Football (CIF). He was signed by the Dorados as a street free agent in 2009. He played college football for the Texas Longhorns.

Early years
Taylor was born on September 11, 1985 in Temple, Texas. At Belton High School, Taylor produced a school record of 4,010 rushing yards and 62 touchdowns over three years.

College career
In 2004, he accumulated 284 yards rushing.  In the 2005 season, his second with the Longhorns, he compiled a total of 1,219 offensive yards for 15 touchdowns.

In May 2006, Taylor was arrested on marijuana charges.  Longhorn coach Mack Brown dismissed Taylor from the team due to academic and legal troubles.  In September 2006, he pleaded guilty to the felony drug charges and was sentenced to 60 days in jail and five years deferred adjudication. In early 2008, he was put in jail for five months for violating his probation.

Post-college career
Taylor was expected to be taken in the 2007 NFL Draft, but he was not chosen.

On January 15, 2009, he was assigned to the Rio Grande Valley Dorados' training camp roster.

On June 4, 2009, the Winnipeg Blue Bombers of the Canadian Football League signed him to a contract. He was released on June 19, 2009. On October 7, 2009, he was signed by the Edmonton Eskimos of the Canadian Football League. On June 22, 2010, the Edmonton Eskimos cut seven players from training camp, including second-year running back Taylor.

Taylor spent 2011 and the years since playing for a series of Indoor Football League teams, including the Rio Grande Valley Magic, Allen Wranglers, Texas Revolution, Nebraska Danger, and Sioux Falls Storm. In March 2014, the Texas Revolution announced that they had re-signed Taylor.

On March 30, 2017, Taylor was signed by the CenTex Cavalry.

References

1985 births
Living people
American football running backs
Canadian football running backs
Edmonton Elks players
People from Temple, Texas
Players of American football from Texas
Belton High School (Belton, Texas) alumni
Rio Grande Valley Dorados players
Texas Longhorns football players
Winnipeg Blue Bombers players
Allen Wranglers players
Texas Revolution players
Nebraska Danger players
Sioux Falls Storm players
CenTex Cavalry players